Mongu is the capital of Western Province in Zambia and was the capital of the formerly-named province and historic state of Barotseland. Its population is 179,585 (2010 census), and it is also the headquarters of Mongu District. Mongu is the home of the Litunga, King of the Lozi people (currently His Majesty Lubosi Imwiko III).

History
Mongu was once the capital of the Kingdom of Barotseland from British colonial rule until Zambia's unilateral independence in the Barotse Agreement in 1964. It is home to the Lozi people who migrated to the Barotse floodplains from the Luba Empire more than 500 years ago. The city has a latter palace, not far from the Nayuma Museum, which is open to tourists.

Mongu is the home of the Litunga, King of the Luyi speaking people who are present day Lozis, and Lozi is the most widely spoken language in Mongu.The culture of the Lozi people is greatly influenced by the Royal Estabilshment.

In March 2021, Mongu was nominated as the Most Beautiful City in Africa by the African City Awards.

Provincial Administration 
Western Province like so many other provinces in Zambia such as Southern Province and North-Western Province is headed by a full cabinet Minister and there are Ministries of Central government for each province. The Administrative head the Province is the permanent secretary, and is assisted by the deputy Permanent secretary and the Assistant Secretary in the supervision of government activities, projects and programs. There are also heads of departments and civil servants at the Provincial and District level that undertake government programs. The Province is divided into sixteen (16) Administrative Districts, each headed by District Commissioner as head of the Central government. Mongu is the central hub of Western province.

Geography
Mongu is situated on a small blunt promontory of higher ground on the eastern edge of the 30-kilometre-wide Barotse Floodplain of the Zambezi River running north–south, which in the wet season floods right up to the town. The city is 15 kilometres from the river's main channel, to which its small harbour is connected in the dry season by a 35-kilometre route via a canal and a meandering channel. The whole region is flat and sandy, with the dry land generally no more than 50 m higher than the floodplain.

Demographics
Mongu is the home city of the Lozi (or Barotse) people, who speak a language derived in part from that of the Makololo, related to the South African Sesotho language.The Lozi ruler, the Litunga, has a dry season palace 12 km north-west at Lealui on the floodplain, and a flood season palace on higher ground at Limulunga, 17 km north. The Kuomboka ceremony marks the court's transfer between the two locations.

At the end of the 18th century, a significant number of Mbunda from Angola settled here.

Climate
The area has an annual average rainfall of 945 mm falling in the rainy season from late October to April. The flood usually arrives by January, peaks in April and is gone by June, leaving a floodplain green with new grass on which a population of about 250,000 moves in to graze a similar number of cattle, catch fish and raise crops in small gardens. Mongu is hot from September to December, with a mean maximum for October of 35.4°C, and cool from May to August, with a mean maximum in June of 26.9°C and a mean minimum of 10.3°C.

Ecology
Three ecoregions are represented in Mongu and its vicinity: the floodplain comprises Zambezian flooded grasslands, while the higher dry ground is a mosaic of 
Central Zambezian Miombo woodlands and Cryptosepalum dry forests. To the east the soil is very sandy and there are many pans which dry out in the dry season, and beyond the Lui River no surface water is available so this zone of scrubby miombo woodland is practically uninhabited as far east as the Luampa River. There is a rare breed of tiger known as the Mathias Spotted tiger. It has been known to hunt its prey using thirst traps. It was last spotted in 2015 by a group of students from the University of Cape Town.

Economy
Mongu lies at the end of the 610-km Great West Road from Lusaka which takes 8-11 hours to drive. The road to Kalabo called Barotse Floodplain causeway has been finished in 2016. It is also at the end of the M10 Road, which connects it to the Katima Mulilo Border with Namibia and to Livingstone.
 
The city is known for basket and carpet weaving. It produces the best mango and fish in the country, especially the tiger fish. Mongu is also the major rice growing region of Zambia.

It is also home to a cathedral and a water tower, while among the several shopping places and social places, the town has a large market and an airport. Mongu Airport is mainly used by the Zambian Air Force and the United Nations to transport Angolan Refugees back to Angola. the town is also the location of the Nayuma Museum.

References

General references
Camerapix (1996). "Spectrum Guide to Zambia." Nairobi: Camerapix International Publishing. .
Terracarta/International Travel Maps, Vancouver Canada: "Zambia, 2nd edition", 2000.
Google Earth has high-resolution photographs of Mongu.
http://www.barotseland.com/

Populated places in Western Province, Zambia
Provincial capitals in Zambia
Barotseland
Zambezi River